Aqyn or akyn (both transcribed as aqın or اقىن), is an improvised poet and singer within the Kazakh and Kyrgyz cultures.

In song competitions known as aytıs, aqyns improvise in the form of a song-like recitative, usually to the accompaniment of a dombra (among Kazakhs) or a komuz (among Kyrgyz). In the context of the nomadic lifestyle and illiteracy of most of the rural population in Central Asia in pre-Soviet times, akyns played an important role in terms of expressing people's thoughts and feelings, exposing social vices, and glorifying heroes. In the Soviet era, their repertoire incorporated praise songs to Lenin.

Contemporary aqyns may also publish their original lyrics and poetry.

Kazakh aqyns 
Famous historical Kazakh aqyns include: Janak Kambaruluy (1760–1857), Makhambet Otemisuly (1804–1846), Suunbai Aronuly (1815–1898), Şernyz Jarylgasov (1817–1881), Birjan-Sal Khodgulov (1834–1897), Ziaus Baijanov (1835–1929), Akan Sere Corramsauluy (1843–1913), Zhambyl Zhabayuly (1846–1945), Gaziz Firesoll (mind 1930), Kenen Azerbaev (1884–1976), and Aqtan Kereiuly.

Aqyns often fully improvise, responding to any phenomena in society or at the situation on nationwide holidays, etc. On holidays, a kind of aqyn competition is often held. During the aqua contest, having fun, alternately in poetry form, try to make fun of each other or choosing any arbitrary theme. Sometimes, the authorities are trying to subjected to Aytyus censorship when it comes to the power of property or politicians.

The nomadic lifestyle and the speed of the art of Akynov did not allow the work in the past and maintain works on paper. Most of the works of Aquins remained lost.

Literature 
Nurmakhan, Zhanash: Kazaktyn 5000 Akyn-zhyrauy. Almaty 2008.

See also 
 Kazakh music
 Kyrgyz music

References

External links
 "Alpamysh" at the Uysal-Walker Archive of Turkish Oral Narrative, Texas Tech University
Central Asian Identity Under Russian Rule

Kazakhstani culture
Kyrgyz-language literature
Masterpieces of the Oral and Intangible Heritage of Humanity
Poets

ky:Акын